Daniel Herrera Vidiella (born 1963) is a Uruguayan rugby union coach.

He was in charge of Uruguay, from 1994 to 1999, when he achieved his country's first ever qualification for the Rugby World Cup finals, after defeating Portugal twice in the repechage. In the 1999 Rugby World Cup finals, he achieved a win over Spain (27-15). Herrera was one of the youngest coaches at the tournament and was even younger than his older player, Diego Ormaechea, aged 40.

External links
Profile of Daniel Herrera

1963 births
Living people
Uruguayan rugby union coaches
Uruguay national rugby union team coaches